Isabelle of France (March 1224 – 23 February 1270) was a French princess, the daughter of Louis VIII of France and Blanche of Castile. She was a younger sister of King Louis IX of France (Saint Louis) and of Alfonso, Count of Poitiers, and an older sister of King Charles I of Sicily. In 1256, she founded the nunnery of Longchamp in part of the Forest of Rouvray (now called the Bois de Boulogne), west of Paris. Isabelle consecrated her virginity and her entire life to God alone. She is honored as a saint by the Franciscan Order. Her feast day is 22 February.

Early life

Isabelle's father died when she was two years old, and it was her mother, Blanche, who oversaw her education. She could read both Latin and the vernacular, and enjoyed tales of chivalry as well as devotional texts. While pursuing the traditional feminine interests such as embroidery, she took special pleasure in working on priestly vestments. As a child, she requested spiritual direction and became even more devoted to the Lord under the guidance of the Franciscans.

By virtue of the Treaty of Vendôme in March 1227, Isabelle was betrothed to Hugh, eldest son and heir of Hugh X of Lusignan, with the marriage contract being signed on June 1230; however, she refused to celebrate the formal wedding due to her fixed determination to remain a virgin, although she never became a nun. Later, she refused the hand of Conrad IV of Germany, son of Frederick II, Holy Roman Emperor, although pressed to accept by everyone, even by Innocent IV.

Isabel sent from her table the nicest dishes to the poor, and reserved for them almost whatever was at her disposal. By the papal bull of 26 May 1254, Pope Innocent IV allowed her to retain some Franciscan friars as her special confessors. She was even more devoted to the Franciscan Order than was her royal brother.

Longchamp Abbey

As Isabelle wished to found a community of Sorores minores (Sisters minor), her brother King Louis began in 1255 to acquire the necessary land in the Forest of Rouvray, not far from the Seine, west of Paris. On 10 June 1256, the first stone of the monastic church was laid.  Pope Alexander IV gave his sanction on 2 February 1259 to the new Rule, which was composed especially for this monastery by Isabelle along with a team of Franciscan university masters including Bonaventure. The community was allowed to hold property. The monastery was named the Convent of the Humility of the Blessed Virgin. In the Rule the nuns were called the Sisters of the Humble Order of Servants of the Most Blessed Virgin Mary. The nuns were subject to the Friars Minor. Some of the first nuns came from the Poor Clare monastery in Reims. A revised version of the Rule was approved by Pope Urban IV on 27 July 1263, which granted preferred the name of Sorores minores inclusae, or Enclosed Sisters minor, for the nuns of Longchamp.

After the death of her mother, Isabelle retired to Longchamps, although she never actually joined the joined the religious community there. She suffered from illnesses during her life, which prevented her from following the rule of life for the nuns. As patroness, she lived there in a room separate from the nuns' cells. she refused to become abbess, which allowed her to retain her wealth and resources, so she could support her abbey and continue to give to the poor. She kept a discipline of silence for most of her day. Her brother, the King, visited often.

Death

Isabelle died at Longchamp on 23 February 1270, and was buried in the abbey church. After nine days her body was exhumed; according to the religious legend, it showed no signs of decay, and many miracles were said to have been wrought at her grave. In 1521 Pope Leo X allowed the abbey to celebrate her feast day with a special Office. On 4 June 1637, a second exhumation took place. On 25 January 1688, the nuns obtained permission to celebrate her feast with an octave, and in 1696 the celebration of the feast on 31 August was permitted to the whole Franciscan Order by Pope Innocent XII.

Longchamp Abbey was suppressed in the French Revolution. In 1794 the empty building was offered for sale, but, as no one wished to purchase it, it was destroyed. In 1857 the remaining walls were pulled down, except for one tower, and the land was incorporated into the Bois de Boulogne.

Ancestry

See also
 Saint Isabelle of France, patron saint archive

References

Sources
  purple
 Nolan, Kathleen D. Capetian Women, 2003.

Further reading
Agnes d'Harcourt (third Prioress of Longchamp, 1263–1270), Vie de Madame Isabelle.
Sean L. Field, Isabelle of France:  Capetian Sanctity and Franciscan Identity in the Thirteenth Century (University of Notre Dame Press, 2006), . 
Sean L. Field, ed. and trans., The Writings of Agnes of Harcourt:  The Life of Isabelle of France and the Letter on Louis IX and Longchamp (University of Notre Dame Press, 2003).

External links

Catholic Online Saints – St. Isabel of France

1225 births
1270 deaths
House of Capet
Poor Clares
Roman Catholic royal saints
French princesses
French Roman Catholic saints
13th-century Christian saints
Medieval French saints
Children of Louis VIII of France
Female saints of medieval France
13th-century French nuns
Daughters of kings
Franciscan saints